Testament of Orpheus is a 1960 black-and-white film with a few seconds of color film spliced in. Directed by and starring Jean Cocteau, who plays himself as an 18th-century poet, the film includes cameo appearances by Pablo Picasso, Jean Marais, Charles Aznavour, Jean-Pierre Leaud, and Yul Brynner. It is considered the final part of The Orphic Trilogy, following The Blood of a Poet (1930) and Orphée (1950).

One critic described it as a "wry, self-conscious re-examination of a lifetime's obsessions" with Cocteau placing himself at the center of the mythological and fictional world he spun throughout his books, films, plays and paintings. The film includes numerous instances of "double takes", including one scene where Cocteau, walking past himself, looks back to see himself in what was described by one scholar as "a retrospective on the Cocteau œuvre".

The New York Times called it "self-serving", noting that the pretension of the film was certainly intended by Cocteau as his last statement made on film: "as much a long-winded self-analysis as an extraordinary succession of visually arresting images".

Picasso had introduced Cocteau to the photographer Lucien Clergue who was brought in to photo-document the film's production. His black-and-white stills were published in 2001 as Jean Cocteau and The Testament of Orpheus.

References

External links
 
 
 Testament of Orpheus an essay by Jean Cocteau at the Criterion Collection

French black-and-white films
1960s fantasy films
French fantasy films
1960s French-language films
Films directed by Jean Cocteau
Orpheus
Films scored by Georges Auric
Films with screenplays by Jean Cocteau
1960s French films